Walter White (July 19, 1951 – April 10, 2019) was a  professional American football tight end. White played college football at the University of Maryland, College Park. White was drafted by the Pittsburgh Steelers in 1975, but was traded to the Kansas City Chiefs that offseason.  In 1976 he ranked 7th in the NFL in receiving touchdowns with seven (7), and ninth in the NFL in overall receiving yardage with 808 yards, and in 1977 he was among the league leaders in pass receptions, 9th overall with 48.

References

1951 births
2019 deaths
American football tight ends
Kansas City Chiefs players
Maryland Terrapins football players
Players of American football from Virginia
Sportspeople from Charlottesville, Virginia